The Friends Falcons are the athletic teams that represent Friends University, located in Wichita, Kansas, in intercollegiate athletics as a member of the National Association of Intercollegiate Athletics (NAIA), primarily competing in the Kansas Collegiate Athletic Conference (KCAC) since the 1953–54 academic year; which they were a member on a previous stint from 1902–03 to December 1928 (of the 1928–29 school year).

Varsity teams
Friends competes in 23 intercollegiate varsity sports: Men's sports include baseball, basketball, cross country, football, golf, powerlifting, soccer, tennis, track & field (indoor and outdoor) and wrestling; women's sports include basketball, cross country, cheerleading, golf, powerlifting, soccer, softball, tennis, track & field (indoor and outdoor), volleyball and wrestling.

Football
Friends University begins 2012 with long-time coach Monty Lewis, who has held the position since the 2003 season.

Bowl games
In 1972, Friends was defeated by the Ottawa Braves in the Mineral Water Bowl by a score of 27–20.

Mascot
The school's first athletic teams were known as the "Fighting Quakers" which symbolized the schools affiliation with the Society of Friends.  In the 1930s, governance of the institution was turned over to an independent board not affiliated with the religious organization that founded the school.  Still, the University athletic teams remained known as the Fighting Quakers and used a duck as their mascot symbol up to 1960.

After 1960, student body began to desire a different mascot to represent Friends University. "Freddy Falcon" was created as a response to this initiative and adopted by the school.

References

External links